Antanas Klimas (April 17 1924 in Pelekonys–18 September 2016 in Brighton) was a Lithuanian doctor of sciences, onomastician and comparative linguist specializing in the relationships between Baltic, Slavic and Germanic language groups as well as the history of Lithuanian language. He also created Lithuanian textbooks and dictionaries, was the editor for the language journal Lituanus, published academic articles on the Lithuanian and Indo-European linguistics.

Career 
From 1941 to 1943, Klimas did Lithuanian studies and philosophy at Vytautas Magnus University. In 1942, he graduated from the Kaunas Teacher Seminary. In 1944, as the Red Army troops began re-occupying Lithuania, he fled the country. From 1946 to 1947, Klimas studied linguistics and German at the former Baltic University of the University of Hamburg. In 1948, he resettled in the United States and continued his studies at the University of Pennsylvania, Philadelphia, in Alfred Senn's class up until 1950. In 1956, Klimas became a doctor of sciences and in 1970 he was an academician of the Lithuanian Catholic Academy of Science and a professor. In 1989, he was awarded the title of meritorious professor.

From 1950 to 1957, he was a lecturer at the University of Pennsylvania. From 1957 to 1989, he worked in the University of Rochester, New York, where he taught Germanic studies, Indo-European, Baltic, and Slavic linguistics. He died on September 18, 2016, in Brighton, New York.

Selected bibliography 

 1966–1999 Introduction to Modem Lithuanian (Dabartinės lietuvių kalbos įvadas), with L. Dambriūnas and William R. Schmalstieg
 1967 Lithuanian Reader for Self-Instruction (Lietuvių kalbos skaitiniai savimokai), with William R. Schmalstieg
 1977, 2010 Key to the Exercises for Introduction to Modern Lithuanian and Beginner's Lithuanian
 1971 Lithuanian-English Glossary of Linguistic Terminology (Lietuvių-anglų kalbų kalbotyros terminų žodynėlis), with William R. Schmalstieg
 1999 Lithuanian Diminutive Noun Dictionary (Lietuvių kalbos mažybinių (maloninių) daiktavardžių žodynėlis), Vilnius
 2005 Lithuanian Sound Word Dictionary (Lietuvių kalbos garsažodžių žodynėlis), Kaunas
 2005 Lithuanian Homonym Dictionary (Lietuvių kalbos homonimų žodynėlis)
 1993 The Usage of Participle in Lithuanian Language (Lietuvių kalbos dalyvių vartosena), Vilnius
 2002–2003 The Ornaments of a Language (Kalbos puošmenos ir pabiros), Vilnius

References 

1924 births
2016 deaths
Linguists from Lithuania
20th-century linguists
Vytautas Magnus University alumni
University of Rochester faculty